Euriphene rectangula is a butterfly in the family Nymphalidae. It is found from Cameroon to the Democratic Republic of the Congo (Moyen-Congo).

References

Butterflies described in 1920
Euriphene